Solo Guitar (later referred to as Volume 1) is a solo album by guitarist Derek Bailey which was recorded in London in February 1971 and became the second release by Incus. A revised version of this album with alternative improvisations was released as Solo in 1978. In 1995 a CD version incorporating improvisations from the original and revised LPs was released.

Reception

The AllMusic review by Brian Olewnick called it "required listening for any self-respecting Derek Bailey fan and a fascinating, complex, and ultimately delicious disc on its own merits... one of the landmark early albums of English free improvisation" and states "No one, absolutely no one, was playing guitar like this in 1971. ...Bailey occupied a universe of his own, freely improvising with little reference to the jazz tradition (including free jazz), sending splinters of notes into the ether and summoning ringing feedback from the deep innards of his ax".

Track listing
All compositions by Derek Bailey except where noted.
 "Improvisation 4" – 2:02  
 "Improvisation 5" – 7:43  
 "Improvisation 6" – 5:29  
 "Improvisation 7" – 3:10  
 "Where Is the Police?" (Misha Mengelberg) – 8:25  
 "Christiani Eddy" (Willem Breuker) – 5:50  
 "The Squirrel and the Ricketty-Racketty Bridge" (Gavin Bryars) – 6:31  
 "Improvisation 3" – 2:41 Bonus track on CD reissue  
 "Improvisation 8" – 4:19 Bonus track on CD reissue 
 "Improvisation 9" – 1:52 Bonus track on CD reissue 
 "Improvisation 10" – 3:04 Bonus track on CD reissue 
 "Improvisation 11" – 2:16 Bonus track on CD reissue 
 "Improvisation 12" – 3:46 Bonus track on CD reissue

Personnel
Derek Bailey – electric guitar, electric guitar unamplified, acoustic guitar (2 acoustic guitars at the same time not double-tracked), VCS 3 synthesizer
Technical
Bob Woolford, Hugh Davies – recording

References

Free improvisation albums
Incus Records albums
Derek Bailey (guitarist) albums
1971 albums